Arctornis l-nigrum, the black V moth, is a moth of the family Erebidae. The species was described by Otto Friedrich Müller in 1764. It is found in the Palearctic realm and Asia.

The wingspan is 35–45 mm. The moth flies from May to July.

The caterpillars feed on beech and birch.

Subspecies
Arctornis l-nigrum l-nigrum
Arctornis l-nigrum asahinai (Inoue, 1956) (Japan)
Arctornis l-nigrum okurai (Okano, 1959) (Taiwan)
Arctornis l-nigrum ussurica Bytinski-Salz, 1939 (Ussuri)

External links

Black V Moth at UKMoths
Fauna Europaea
Lepiforum.de

Lymantriinae
Moths of Asia
Moths of Europe
Moths described in 1764
Taxa named by Otto Friedrich Müller